Vikas Krishan Yadav (born 10 February 1992) is an Indian boxer from Bhiwani district in Haryana, the hub of some of India's best boxers. He won a gold medal in the 2010 Asian Games in the Lightweight category and a gold medal in 75 kg weight category at the 2018 Commonwealth Games. He is one of the best boxers of India. He also played professional boxing.

Due to the ban on the Boxing Federation of India in 2015, Vikas competed at the World and Asian Championships under the AIBA flag. Vikas Krishan Yadav is the second Indian boxer after Olympian Vijender Singh to qualify for Olympics for the third time.

Personal life and family
Yadav was born in Singhwa Khas village in Hisar district. His father Krishan Kumar is an employee in the Electricity Department. In 1994 he came to Bhiwani along with his father, who was transferred to this city. In 2003, at the age of 10, Yadav joined the Bhiwani Boxing Club where he undertook hard training. Later, he received training in the Army Sports Institute Pune.

After his premature exit from the 2012 Olympics, Yadav took a year off from boxing and focussed on completing his education at the Kurukshetra University and his training with the Haryana State Police. Presently, Yadav is an ACP in Haryana Police.

Vikas Krishan pulled out of his Asian Qualifiers final match. He was scheduled to face Zeyad Eashash in the final However, with an eye injury, Krishan ended his campaign with a silver medal.

Vikas Krishan beat Cameroon's Dieudonne Wilfried Seyi Ntsengue to win the gold medal in men's 75 kg in Common Wealth Games.

Career

2010
Yadav won a gold medal at the 2010 AIBA Youth World Boxing Championships which was organised in Tehran, Iran.

He won a gold medal in 2010 AIBA Youth World Boxing Championships at Baku in the Lightweight category, after defeating Evaldas Petrauskas of Lithuania.

He won a bronze medal in 2010 Summer Youth Olympics in Lightweight category after being defeated by Evaldas Petrauskas of Lithuania in the semifinals.

He won the gold medal after defeating Hu Qing of China 5–4. in 2010 Asian Games which were held in Guangzhou, China.

2011 World Amateur Boxing Championships 
In the Round of 32, Vikas defeated Asadullo Boimurodov of Kyrgyzstan 16:8. He faced Magomed Nurutdinov of Belarus in the Round of 16 and tied the bout 10:10 but won because of last point scored. In the pre quarter-finals, he was up against Onder Sipal of Turkey whom he defeated by 14:7. In the quarter-finals, he faced Vasili Belous of Moldova and won 9:8 over him. In the semi-finals, he met Taras Shelestyuk of Ukraine and lost by 15:12 to him, earning him the bronze medal in the Welterweight category.

2012 Olympics
Vikas Krishan Yadav and the entire Indian contingent were in for a shock as he lost against Errol Spence Jr.Errol  of the United States of America on Friday night after an appeal.

Spence successfully appealed his initial 11–13 loss. Using video review, AIBA determined the bout referee gave too few cautions for holding fouls and should have awarded Spence at least four more points.

2014 Asian Games 
Representing India at the Games held at Incheon, South Korea, he won the bronze medal in the Middleweight (75 kg) category, after losing to Zhanibek Alimkhanuly of Kazakhstan, in the semi-final bout.

His first opponent was Azamat Kanybek Uulu of Kyrgyzstan, beating him 3:0 in the Round of 16. His opponent in the quarter-finals was Hurshidbek Normatov of Uzbekistan whom he beat to 3:0 to progress to the semi-finals.

2015 Asian Boxing Championships 
On September 5, 2015, Vikas reached the final bout of the Middleweight category and lost to Bektemir Melikuziev of Uzbekistan, winning the silver medal.

2015 World Amateur Boxing Championships 
On October 10, 2015, Vikas exited the World Boxing Championships in Doha, Qatar by losing 3–0 to Hosam Abdin of Egypt in the quarter-finals.

2016 Rio Olympics 
Vikas Krishan Yadav qualified for the Rio Olympic Games by finishing with a bronze medal at the Olympic qualifiers held in Baku in June 2016.
He has cruised into the round of 16 in Boxing 75 kg category at the Rio 2016 Olympics. The Indian pugilist beat USA's Charles Cornell by a unanimous decision to progress at the Summer Games. He went on to defeat Önder Şipal of Turkey a few days later to enter the next round of the tournament. Vikas Krishan Yadav was defeated by Bektemir Melikuziev of Uzbekistan in the Quarter Final of Men's Middle 75 kg Boxing in Rio Olympic on 16 August 2016.

2018 Commonwealth and Asian games
Vikas won a gold medal in 2018 Commonwealth Games in Australia defeating Australia, Zambia, northern Ireland and Cameroon. He became the first Indian male boxer to win gold medals at both Asian and commonwealth games. In Asian games 2018 he won bronze. He had to withdraw from further fights because of a serious eye injury.

2020 Tokyo Olympics 

Vikas Krishan Yadav beats Japan's Sewon Okazawa, World No 6 and third seed in the 69 kg weight class by 5–0 to book his Tokyo Olympic ticket. In the semifinals he defeated Ablaikhan Zhussupov of Kazakhstan. His transformation back to 69 kg from 75 kg was inspired by his childhood friend Neeraj Goyat. He also became only the second Indian men boxer after Olympic bronze medallist Vijender Singh to qualify for Third Olympics.

Ranking 
Vikas is currently engaged in the middleweight category, the same category where Vijender Singh won an Olympic bronze medal in the 2008 Olympics. As of September 25, 2015, Vikas is ranked 4th overall.

Awards 
 Best Boxer, National Championships, New Delhi, 2010
 Arjuna Award, 2012

Signing with Top Rank 
On 15 November 2018, Krishan signed a multiyear promotional contract with American-based Top Rank.

Professional boxing record

See also
 Boxing at the 2010 Asian Games
 Boxing at the 2012 Olympics
 Boxing at the 2014 Asian Games
 Indian boxing
 Middleweight boxing category

References

External links 
 
 
 
 

1992 births
Living people
Indian male boxers
AIBA World Boxing Championships medalists
Olympic boxers of India
Boxers at the 2010 Summer Youth Olympics
Boxers at the 2012 Summer Olympics
Boxers at the 2016 Summer Olympics
Boxers at the 2020 Summer Olympics
Asian Games gold medalists for India
Asian Games bronze medalists for India
Asian Games medalists in boxing
Boxers at the 2010 Asian Games
Boxers at the 2014 Asian Games
Boxers at the 2018 Asian Games
Medalists at the 2010 Asian Games
Medalists at the 2014 Asian Games
Medalists at the 2018 Asian Games
Commonwealth Games gold medallists for India
Commonwealth Games medallists in boxing
Boxers at the 2018 Commonwealth Games
Hisar (city)
Recipients of the Arjuna Award
Boxers from Haryana
People from Hisar district
Lightweight boxers
Medallists at the 2018 Commonwealth Games